Adelaide Central Plaza is a shopping centre located on Rundle Mall, Adelaide, South Australia. Its major tenant is David Jones, and the centre also includes a food court and about 40 retail outlets. John Martin's used to be the major tenant of the Plaza before David Jones took over in 1998.

History 
In 1999 the land and development project was sold for $85 million by David Jones to Precision Group.

On 31 August 2000, the centre was officially opened by Premier of South Australia John Olsen.

Also in 2000, the reconstructed David Jones' department store at Adelaide Central Plaza won the Institute of Store Planners International Store Design Award as the best newly completed store in the world for its prototype redesign. The design of the store was completed by Robert Young Associates of Dallas.

During 2013 a $35 million upgrade to the building and David Jones store was announced, and completed in June 2014.

Gallery

References

External links
 Adelaide Central Plaza

Shopping centres in Adelaide